Rainbow Island may refer to:

 Rainbow Island (1917 film), an American silent film starring Harold Lloyd
 Rainbow Island (1944 film), an American film directed by Ralph Murphy
 Rainbow Islands: The Story of Bubble Bobble 2, a 1987 arcade game